THW Kiel  is a handball club from Kiel, Germany. Currently, they compete in the Handball-Bundesliga and are the record champion with 22 titles.

2007 and 2012 were the most successful years in the club's history, as THW completed the treble, winning the domestic league, the domestic cup, and the EHF Champions League.  In 2012, the team won every league game, a first in any top flight German team sports.

They ended the 2019–20 season as winners of the EHF Champions League and champions of the Handball-Bundesliga.

They have a rivalry with fellow Schleswig-Holstein team SG Flensburg-Handewitt.

Crest, colours, supporters

Kits

Accomplishments
Handball-Bundesliga: 22
: 1957, 1962, 1963, 1994, 1995, 1996, 1998, 1999, 2000, 2002, 2005, 2006, 2007, 2008, 2009, 2010, 2012, 2013, 2014, 2015, 2020, 2021
DHB-Pokal: 12
: 1998, 1999, 2000, 2007, 2008, 2009, 2011, 2012, 2013, 2017, 2019, 2022
DHB-Supercup: 12
: 1995, 1998, 2005, 2007, 2008, 2011, 2012, 2014, 2015, 2020, 2021, 2022
EHF Champions League:
: 2007, 2010, 2012, 2020
: 2000, 2008, 2009, 2014
: 2022
EHF Cup:
: 1998, 2002, 2004, 2019
EHF Men's Champions Trophy:
: 2007
: 2004
IHF Super Globe:
: 2011
: 2012, 2019
German Championship: 2 (Field handball)
: 1948, 1950
: 1951, 1953
Double:
1997–98, 1998–99, 1999–00, 2006–07, 2007–08, 2008–09, 2011–12, 2012–13
Triple Crown:
2006–07, 2011–12

European record

Team

Current squad
Squad for the 2022–23 season

Goalkeepers
1  Niklas Landin Jacobsen
 12  Philip Saggau
 16  Tomáš Mrkva
Left wingers
7  Magnus Landin Jacobsen
 23  Rune Dahmke

Right wingers
3  Sven Ehrig 
 18  Niclas Ekberg
 20  Yannick Fraatz
Line players
 11  Petter Øverby
 17  Patrick Wiencek
 61  Hendrik Pekeler

Left backs
8  Ben Battermann
 21  Eric Johansson
 31  Luca Schwormstede
 49  Karl Wallinius 
 53  Nikola Bilyk
Central backs
4  Domagoj Duvnjak (c)
5  Sander Sagosen 
 24  Miha Zarabec
Right backs
6  Harald Reinkind
 13  Steffen Weinhold
 19  Henri Pabst

Transfers
Transfers for the 2023–24 season

 Joining
  Vincent Gérard (GK) (from  Saint-Raphaël Var Handball)
  Elias Ellefsen á Skipagøtu (CB) (from  IK Sävehof)

 Leaving
  Niklas Landin Jacobsen (GK) (to  Aalborg Håndbold) 
  Sander Sagosen (CB) (to  Kolstad Håndball)
  Miha Zarabec (CB) (to  Wisła Płock) 
  Yannick Fraatz (RW) (end of loan from  Bergischer HC)

Transfers for the 2024–25 season

 Joining
  Lukas Zerbe (RW) (from  TBV Lemgo)
  Julian Köster (LB) (from  VfL Gummersbach) ?

 Leaving

Staff
Staff for the 2022–23 season

Notable former players

  Heinrich Dahlinger (1936–1966)
  Michael Krieter (1983–1998)
  Wolfgang Schwenke (1996–2001)
  Uwe Schwenker (1980–1992)
  Henning Fritz (2001–2007)
  Dominik Klein (2006–2016)
  Thomas Knorr (1992–1998)
  Tobias Reichmann (2009–2012)
  Christian Sprenger (2009–2017)
  Christian Zeitz (2003–2014, 2016–2018)
  Andreas Wolff (2016–2019)
  Christian Dissinger (2015–2018)
  Patrick Wiencek (2012– )
  Steffen Weinhold (2014– )
  Hendrik Pekeler (2018– )
  Dario Quenstedt (2019–2022)
  Rune Dahmke (2012– )
  Stefan Lövgren (1999–2009)
  Staffan Olsson (1996–2003)
  Magnus Wislander (1990–2002)
  Johan Petersson (2001–2005)
  Kim Andersson (2005–2012)
  Marcus Ahlm (2003–2013)
  Peter Gentzel (2009–2010)
  Henrik Lundström (2004–2012)
  Martin Boquist (2003–2005)
  Mattias Andersson (2001–2008)
  Pelle Linders (2005–2007)
  Andreas Palicka (2008–2015)
  Lukas Nilsson (2016–2020)
  Niclas Ekberg (2012– )
  Nikolaj Jacobsen (1998–2004)
  Rasmus Lauge Schmidt (2013–2015)
  René Toft Hansen (2012–2018)
  Lars Krogh Jeppesen (2006–2007)
  Morten Bjerre (2000–2003)
  Niklas Landin Jacobsen (2015–2023)
  Magnus Landin Jacobsen (2018– )
  Nikola Karabatić (2005–2009)
  Daniel Narcisse (2009–2013)
  Thierry Omeyer (2006–2013)
  Jérôme Fernandez (2010–2011)
  Igor Anić (2015–2016)
  Børge Lund (2007–2010)
  Frode Hagen (2004–2006)
  Steinar Ege (1999–2002, 2015)
  Sander Sagosen (2020–2023)
  Harald Reinkind (2018– )
  Goran Stojanović (1996–1999)
  Ljubomir Pavlović (2003)
  Momir Ilić (2009–2013)
  Marko Vujin (2012–2019)
  Davor Dominiković (2002–2003)
  Ilija Brozović (2016–2017)
  Blaženko Lacković (2016–2017)
  Domagoj Duvnjak (2014– )
  Marek Panas (1982–1989)
  Daniel Waszkiewicz (1987–1990)
  Piotr Przybecki (2001–2004)
  Predrag Timko (1977–1980)
  Nenad Peruničić (1997–2001)
  Goran Stojanović (1996–1999)
  Guðjón Valur Sigurðsson (2012–2014)
  Aron Pálmarsson (2009–2015)
  Filip Jícha (2007–2015)
  Pavel Horák (2019–2022)
  Vid Kavtičnik (2005–2009)
  Miha Zarabec (2017–2023)
  Demetrio Lozano (2001–2004)
  Joan Cañellas (2014–2016)
  Nikola Bilyk (2016– )
  Wael Jallouz (2013–2014)
  Zvonimir Serdarušić (1980–1981)
  Andrei Xepkin (2007)
  Julio Fis (2001–2002)

Notable former coaches
  Fritz Westheider  (1930–1958)
  Heinrich Dahlinger  (1958–1972)
  Kurt Bartels,  Rolf Krabbenhöft,  Bernd Struck  (1972–1973)
  Adolf Gabriel  (1973–1975)
  Werner Kirst  (1975)
  Gerd Welz  (1975–1977)
  Željko Seleš  (1977–1978)
  Werner Kirst  (1978–1979)
  Gerd Welz  (1979–1980)
  Marinko Andrić  (1980–1981)
  Herward Wieck  (1981–1982)
  Jóhann Ingi Gunnarsson  (1983–1986)
  Marek Panas  (1987–1989)
  Josip Milković  (1989)
  Holger Oertel  (1989–1992)
  Uwe Schwenker  (1993)
   Zvonimir Serdarušić  (1993–2008)
  Alfreð Gíslason  (2008–2019)

References

External links

 Official website

German handball clubs
Handball-Bundesliga
Sport in Kiel
Handball clubs established in 1904
1904 establishments in Germany